Doroukome was a town of ancient Lydia, inhabited during Roman times.

Its site is tentatively located near Ayvatlar in Asiatic Turkey.

References

Populated places in ancient Lydia
Former populated places in Turkey
Roman towns and cities in Turkey
History of Manisa Province